The Tilougguit Formation, also known as the Tillouguit Formation, is an Early Bathonian geologic formation in Morocco. An indeterminate sauropod is known from the formation

See also 
 List of dinosaur-bearing rock formations
 List of stratigraphic units with indeterminate dinosaur fossils
 Geology of Morocco

References

Bibliography

Further reading 
 J. Bourcart, A. F. d. Lapparent, and H. Termier. 1942. Un nouveau gisement de Dinosauriens jurassiques au Maroc [A new locality with Jurassic dinosaurs in Morocco]. Comptes Rendus de l'Académie des Sciences à Paris 214:120-122
 J. Jenny, A. Le Marrec, and M. Monbaron. 1981. Les empreintes de pas de dinosauriens dans le Jurassique moyen du Haut Atlas central (Maroc): nouveaux gisements et precisions stratigraphiques. Géobios 14(3):427-431
 S. Jouve, B. Mennecart, J. Douteau and N.-E. Jalil. 2016. The oldest durophagous teleosauroid (Crocodylomorpha, Thalattosuchia) from the lower Bathonian of central High Atlas, Morocco. Palaeontology

Geologic formations of Morocco
Jurassic System of Africa
Jurassic Morocco
Bathonian Stage
Marl formations
Sandstone formations
Deltaic deposits
Fluvial deposits
Azilal Province